The Individual freestyle test grade II equestrian event at the 2004 Summer Paralympics was competed on 24 September. It was won by Irene Slaettengren, representing .

Final round
24 Sept. 2004, 10:00

References

2004 Summer Paralympics events